Cité Aline Sitoe Diatta is a neighborhood in west central Dakar, Senegal.

Overview 

Formerly known as Cité Claudel, after independence the area was named after Aline Sitoe Diatta, an anti-colonial leader from Casamance. Although the name has changed, many still refer to the area as Claudel or Fann.  Cité Aline Sitoe Diatta is the home of Cheikh Anta Diop University, and consequently hosts a large, vibrant (and often crowded) student community.  Just west of the prosperous Medina neighborhood and bordered by the ocean Corniche road and Point Fann, in the early 20th century the area was military drill ground, called the "Champ de Fann", which later became a sports ground.  Administratively, it is part of Dakar Plateau, the city center.  As it lies at the conjunction of the University area and the government and business center of the nation, it is often the scene of student protests.

References 

 Journées culturelles à la cité Aline Sitoé Diatta : Les étudiantes célèbrent leur marraine: IDRISSA SANE Le Soleil 24 February 2004.
 Sénégal: Université de Dakar - La cité 'Claudel' transformée en 'hôtel particulier', Wal Fadjri (Dakar), 24 August 2007.
 Malaise à l’UCAD: Les étudiants "confisquent" un bus Dakar Dem Dikk, les travailleurs menacent d’aller en grêve. Xalima, 28 November 2007.
 Le campus social de l’Ucad fermé Les étudiants outrés d’être relogés à la Cité Aline Sitoé Diatta (ex. Claudel), Xalima, 22 August 2007.

See also 
 Dakar
 Cheikh Anta Diop University

Dakar